Events from the year 1743 in Canada.

Incumbents
French Monarch: Louis XV
British and Irish Monarch: George II

Governors
Governor General of New France: Charles de la Boische, Marquis de Beauharnois
Colonial Governor of Louisiana: Jean-Baptiste Le Moyne de Bienville then Pierre de Rigaud, Marquis de Vaudreuil-Cavagnial
Governor of Nova Scotia: Paul Mascarene
Commodore-Governor of Newfoundland: Thomas Smith

Events
 Concentrated hunting of sea otter by Russia begins.
 Father Claude-Godefroy Coquart joins La Vérendrye at Fort La Reine becoming the first recorded missionary in present-day Manitoba and the first to travel beyond Lake of the Woods.

Deaths
 April 11 - Jean-Baptiste Chardon, jesuit missionary (born 1672).

Historical documents
Montreal merchant sells five enslaved Black people (2 men, 3 "women and girls") in Quebec City for 3,000 livres

Ordinance refers to 445,000-livre construction expense for Montreal wall, with part of 115,500 livres paid by city returned by king

Any war declared against France need not involve Acadians and Indigenous people, "if they are wise" (Note: "savages" used)

Nova Scotia president Mascarene points out dangers of having potentially insurgent population, far too few soldiers and poor defences in case of war

Council hears "Indians [have] no Intention to take or Pillage the Traders," but orders all to "even by force[...]Prevent all Such Robberys"

Council orders priests (and their parishioners) to get its prior consent to enter Nova Scotia, and not "behave themselves Irregularly"

Mascarene satisfied with all but one priest and says "if everyone aims at the same End We may prevent trouble from approaching Us"

Visitor to Onondaga describes town and its situation, longhouse, and "comical fellow" with mask, staff and rattle

Sixteen-year-old James Wolfe marches "in the greatest Spirits [and] shall be very well able to hold it out with a Little help of a Horse"

References 

 
Canada
43
1740s in Canada